Terry Echols (born January 10, 1962) is a former American football linebacker. He played for the Pittsburgh Steelers in 1984.

References

1962 births
Living people
American football linebackers
Marshall Thundering Herd football players
People from Mullens, West Virginia
Pittsburgh Steelers players
Players of American football from West Virginia